François Compaoré (born 11 January 1954) is a Burkinabé politician. He was Economic Adviser to the President of Burkina Faso, Blaise Compaoré, from 1989 to 2014; he is Compaoré's younger brother.

Life and career
At the Fifth Ordinary Congress of the Congress for Democracy and Progress (CDP), François Compaoré was designated as a member of the CDP's National Executive Secretariat, with the post of Secretary of the Associative Movement, on 4 March 2012. He ranked 11th on the National Executive Secretariat.

By 2012, François Compaoré was "considered the new CDP strongman", and speculation centered on the possibility that he could succeed his brother at the time of the 2015 presidential election. Unless the constitution was amended prior to that point, Blaise Compaoré would be unable to stand for another term, as he would have exhausted the constitutional limit of two terms.

In the December 2012 parliamentary election, Compaoré stood as the second candidate on the CDP's candidate list for Kadiogo Province, which includes Ouagadougou, the capital. The CDP won four of the available seats in Kadiogo, thus securing Compaoré a parliamentary seat. He nevertheless chose not to sit as a Deputy in the National Assembly, leaving his substitute to take his seat.

In 2014, he fled to Benin when his brother lost power.

References

Burkinabé politicians
Living people
1954 births
21st-century Burkinabé people